The 1999 Sokoto State gubernatorial election occurred on January 9, 1999. APP candidate Attahiru Bafarawa won the election, defeating PDP candidate Muhammadu Modi Yabo.

Results
Attahiru Bafarawa from the APP won the election. PDP candidate Muhammadu Modi Yabo and AD candidate contested in the election.

The total number of registered voters in the state was 1,248,311, total votes cast was 462,595, valid votes was 436,738 and rejected votes was 25,857.

Umaru Musa Yar'Adua, (APP)- 249,205

Muhammadu Modi Yabo, PDP- 182,655

AD- 4,878

References 

Sokoto State gubernatorial election
Sokoto State gubernatorial election

1999